Xanthi B.C. was a Greek professional basketball club that is located in Western Thrace, Xanthi, Greece. Xanthi competed in the Greek 2nd Division.

History
Xanthi competed in the 2nd-tier level Greek 2nd Division, and then merged with Koroivos in 2010. Koroivos then took over Xanthi's place in the Greek 2nd Division in the following season.

After Koroivos took Xanthi's place in the Greek 2nd Division, Xanthi was then relegated down to the 5th-tier level league in Greece, due to the club's financial problems.

The club then merged with A.P.S. Aspida Xanthi for the 2010–11 season.

Arena
The club's home arena is Xanthi Arena. Its capacity is 5,000.

Notable players
 Dimitrios Spanoulis
 Sakis Karidas

References

External links
Eurobasket.com Team Page

Basketball teams in Greece
Defunct basketball teams in Greece
Xanthi
Basketball teams disestablished in 2010